TSD were an English pop group who had a UK #69 hit with "Heart and Soul", which also peaked at #258 in Australia, and a UK #64 hit with "Baby I Love You", a cover of The Ronettes song. One of its members, Claire Richards, became a member of Steps, whose debut single, "5,6,7,8", charted fifty places higher at #14 in the UK.

The name "TSD" means very little; it was formed by taking three random letters out of a Scrabble bag. However, Newsround presenter Chris Rogers suggested it should stand for "Three Sexy Dames".  During an  interview on H’s BBC wales radio show Claire Richards revealed that TSD in fact  did stand for something, the record label had the name already and it stood for “The Scan Dolls” a play on words meant to sound like the scandals. The girls hated the meaning and chose to go with the random letters story with  the UK press.

References

English pop music groups
English girl groups
British Eurodance groups
Musical groups established in 1995
Musical groups disestablished in 1996